Northford is a census-designated place (CDP) comprising the primary village and surrounding residential and rural land in the town of North Branford, New Haven County, Connecticut, United States. It is in the northern part of the town, bordered to the west by the town of North Haven, to the east by the town of Guilford, and to the north by the town of Wallingford, all in New Haven County. It is bordered to the northeast by the town of Durham in Middlesex County. In 2002,  of the central village of Northford were designated as the Northford Center Historic District.

Northford was first listed as a CDP prior to the 2020 census.

References 

Census-designated places in New Haven County, Connecticut
Census-designated places in Connecticut